is a retired Japanese football player. He plays as a winger, comfortable on both flanks. Apart from his speed and dribbling skills, the ability to take set pieces is also part of his key attributes.

Career
Born and raised in Chiba Inui played for numerous clubs in and around the city before being signed to JEF United Chiba. He made his J1 League debut on 29 June 2008 in the 2008 J. League match against FC Tokyo. The game ended 1-1. Inui then signed for Albirex Niigata FC (Singapore) the Singapore S.League division of the Japanese-based Albirex Niigata in 2010.

In 2012, he went on to sign a 2-year contract with S.League side Singapore Armed Forces Football Club after his 2-year stint with the White Swans. He mentioned that having a chance to participate in AFC Cup was one of the main reason behind the move. Having won the 2012 RHB Singapore Cup, he will finally achieve his target in the following season. Unfortunately, the team was knocked out during the Group Stage having only won 1 out of the 6 games and lost the remainder.

After the end of his contract, Inui returned to Japan for trials. In January 2014, it was announced on J3 League side SC Sagamihara's official website that Inui has been signed by the club.

In September 2014, Inui was back in Singapore. He was seen undergoing a trial with Geylang International where he played a friendly match against his former club Warriors FC at the Bedok Stadium.

He re-signed for former club Albirex Niigata FC (Singapore) for the 2016 S.League season and scored his first goal of the season against Hougang United to send the White Swans to the top of the S.League table at the start of April.

After joining Thai Honda, he left in the midseason to join J3 club, Blaublitz Akita.

Club career statistics
As of 27 December 2016

Honours

Club
S.League
 2016: Champions
Singapore Cup
 2012: Champions
 2016: Champions
Singapore League Cup
 2011: Champions
 2016: Champions
Singapore Charity Shield
 2016: Champions
 Blaublitz Akita
 J3 League (1): 2017
Cambodian League
 2018: Champion

Individual
 2011 S.League Young Player of the Year

References

External links

 
 Albirex Niigata profile
 SAFFC profile

1990 births
Living people
Association football people from Chiba Prefecture
Japanese footballers
J1 League players
J3 League players
Singapore Premier League players
JEF United Chiba players
Albirex Niigata Singapore FC players
Warriors FC players
SC Sagamihara players
Geylang International FC players
Japanese expatriate footballers
Expatriate footballers in Singapore
Japanese expatriate sportspeople in Singapore
Association football wingers
Expatriate footballers in Cambodia
Nagaworld FC players
Japanese expatriate sportspeople in Cambodia